Andrew Nowell (by 1512 – 31 January 1563), of Whitwell, Rutland and Old Dalby, Leicestershire, was an English politician.

He was a Member (MP) of the Parliament of England for Rutland in October 1553.

References

1563 deaths
English MPs 1553 (Mary I)
People from Rutland
People from the Borough of Melton
Year of birth uncertain
Andrew